Abd-Ya-Layl ibn Amr, of the Banu Thaqif tribe was one of the chieftains of the city of Ta'if, a city hostile to Islam. However, in 631 or 632, he was included in a delegation that resulted in his tribe accepting Islam.

See also
Sahaba

External links
The Year of Deputations and Abu Bakr's Leadership of the Pilgrimage, Witness-Pioneer.org
March on Tabook, Inter-Islam.org

Banu Thaqif
Companions of the Prophet